Parsian Bank (Bank Parsian) is a major Iranian private bank, headquartered in Tehran, Iran. In addition to traditional banking services, Parsian also offers diversified services such as insurance and car rentals.

The most successful branch of Parsian Bank is the Leasing branch.

History 

Parsian Bank  was founded in July 2001, and opened for business in 2002. It entered the Tehran Stock Exchange in 2004. 
Reuters news agency describes the bank as "Iran's largest non-state bank"  in 2006, known for offering slightly higher interest rates on accounts than state-run banks, financing of as much as 80% of a property's value, so that financing was a real option for many new homebuyers, and its liberal dress code. This started to change in 2005, when Parsian's managing director, Abdollah Talebi, refused to give Mohammad Shariatmadari (head of the powerful Setade Ejraiye Farmane Emam foundation at the time), an unsecured $44 million loan (Shariatmadari had offered no collateral for the loan).

In early 2006 the bank faced severe financial difficulties due to a forced interest rate change imposed upon the banking sector by the Iranian President, Mahmoud Ahmadinejad. Until then, the bank's strategy had required providing long term fixed high interest accounts, however when interest rates were slashed the income providing loans that Parsian was receiving ended up at a lower rate than the rates it was paying out in the long term savings accounts, thus creating a cashflow problem. The problems are still unresolved as of October 2006.

According to Saeed Laylaz, economic and political observer in Tehran, "One reason for Ahmadinejad's antagonism to Parsian Bank was that he thought the bank was owned by the family of Ayatollah Hashemi Rafsanjani, his main rival in the presidential elections. After Ahmadinejad took office, Abdollah Talebi [Parsian CEO], an outspoken reformist, sent a list of the shareholders to the President to prove that was untrue. The bank is a symbol of bourgeoisie for Ahmadinejad".

Subsequently, according to Reuters, Tadbir Investment Co, (a subsidiary of Setad) acquired a small stake in Parsian and despite being a minority owner transformed the bank, bringing in new managers and among other things eliminating the lacks dress code.

On 19 September, 1.44 million shares of the bank traded on the Tehran Stock Exchange. The shares, worth a total of about $320 million, were bought by a single customer. The shares – which comprised about 29% of the Bank's total shares – belonged to Iran Khodro Industrial Group (A government company). The bank has still not publicly named the new owners of the stake.

In September 2010, a 10% stake in Parsian E-Commerce, the online banking subsidiary of Parsian Bank, was successfully sold on the Iranian Over-The-Counter (OTC) market. The IPO was worth $116 million.

Parsian Insurance, the third largest insurance provider in Iran, is jointly owned by Parsian Bank and Iran Khodro. Its key business line is car insurance.

Chairman and board of directors
 Kourosh Parvizian (CEO)

See also

Banking and insurance in Iran
Islamic Banking

References

External links
Official Website (English Version)

Banks of Iran
Banks established in 2002
Companies listed on the Tehran Stock Exchange
Iranian brands
Iranian companies established in 2002
Iranian entities subject to the U.S. Department of the Treasury sanctions